Millwa Qaqa (Ancash Quechua millma, millwa wool, qaqa rock, "wool rock", also spelled Millhuagaga) is a mountain in the Andes of Peru which reaches a height of approximately . It is located in the Ancash Region, Bolognesi Province, Huallanca District.

References

Mountains of Peru
Mountains of Ancash Region